The University of Nursing, Mandalay (also the Institute of Nursing, Mandalay;) is a university of nursing, located in Mandalay, Myanmar. It is one of three universities in the nation that offers a four-year bachelor's degree program in nursing. The university also offers a master's degree program in nursing.

The university, which admits only 100 students per year, is one of the more selective universities in the nation. Nursing is one of few professions in Myanmar that provides decent job opportunities—inside or outside the country. The University Entrance Examination matriculation marks required for admission in 2006 was 380 out 600, slightly below what was required to go to medical school.

Speciality diploma programs in dental, EENT, mental health, pediatrics, critical care, and orthopedics are offered only at the Yangon Institute of Nursing.

Gallery

References

External links
Official website

Universities and colleges in Mandalay
Medical schools in Myanmar
Universities and colleges in Myanmar
1998 establishments in Myanmar
Educational institutions established in 1998